The NZR EO class of 1923 were electric locomotives used on the steep Otira to Arthurs Pass section of the Midland Line in New Zealand. They were primarily needed for pulling trains through the 1 in 33 grade  Otira Tunnel which was too long and steep to allow steam locomotives to be used.

Introduction
When the Otira tunnel was being built, steam locomotives were not considered for use in the tunnel, because smoke would build up in the tunnel and be difficult to clear. The English Electric Company, of London, won the contract to supply six electric locomotives, the installation of overhead contact wires, and the building of a coal-fired electric power station at Otira.  On 10 April 1923 six electric locomotives arrived, numbered E 2 to E 6 (1 was the Class E battery electric loco built in 1922). 

They were later reclassified EO to avoid confusion with the EC class locomotives.

Service
The locomotives coped well in service, and from 1942 it became standard practice to run three locomotives together with only two pantographs up, and have their pantographs linked by jumper cables. This was deemed dangerous and soon each locomotive ran with its own pantograph up. 

This often resulted in heavy sparking. so they were run as a set of three locos in multiple-unit control with a two-man crew (an uphill driver and a downhill driver) and one driver sitting in each end cab. They had been altered in 1940 to a single cab design. Eastbound trains were reduced to smaller loads, usually with different train numbers. With 14 timetabled trips a day this was over 5,000 tons eastward daily. Westbound empties or loaded goods trains generally came down as complete trains.

They were referred to as "trams", a term carried over to the 1967 Toshiba replacements.

Withdrawal and preservation
The class were replaced in April 1968 by the EA locomotives (which were later re-designated as the EO class of 1968). All but one were scrapped.

EO 3 was preserved by the Canterbury Railway Society. The locomotive arrived at the Ferrymead Heritage Park in 1972 and was restored to operating order in 1977. The locomotive has had the removed cab restored to the original style and carries its original number E 3 on that end of the locomotive. The loco received a Restoration Award from the National Federation of Railway Societies in 1996 and today can be seen operating on the Ferrymead Railway.

References

Citations

Bibliography

External links
Photo of coal-fired electric power station at Otira c1928

Bo-Bo locomotives
English Electric locomotives
1500 V DC locomotives
Electric locomotives of New Zealand
3 ft 6 in gauge locomotives of New Zealand
Railway locomotives introduced in 1923